Brian Finley (born July 13, 1981) is a Canadian former professional ice hockey goaltender.

Playing career
Finley was born in Sault Ste. Marie, Ontario. As a youth, he played in the 1995 Quebec International Pee-Wee Hockey Tournament with a minor ice hockey team from Sault Ste. Marie. As the top rated goaltender Finley was drafted by the Nashville Predators in the first round, sixth overall of the 1999 NHL Entry Draft.

Finley as a standout junior goaltender played most of his junior hockey with the Barrie Colts of the OHL, before being traded in his final year to the Brampton Battalion. While with the Barrie Colts he led the team to the Finals of the Memorial Cup in 2000 where they lost to the Rimouski Océanic 6–3. Finley played as primarily the backup goalie for the Canadian Junior Hockey Team at the World Junior Hockey Tournament in 1999 and 2000.

Finley spent the majority of his career playing in the AHL for the Milwaukee Admirals as a solid goalie. He won the Calder Cup with the Admirals in 2004. He played two career games for the Nashville Predators in the NHL, allowing 10 goals in 107 minutes.

When the Predators chose not to qualify him after the 2005–06 season Finley signed as a free agent with the Boston Bruins on July 17, 2006. During the 2006–07 season he played ten games for the Providence Bruins and two games for the Boston Bruins. This would be his last professional season, as after the 2006–07 season, Finley became a Group 6 unrestricted free agent and chose to retire, having played just 4 NHL games.

Personal
Following his retirement from professional hockey, Finley has been working as a York Regional Police Officer since 2009.

Career statistics

Regular season and playoffs

International

References

External links
 
 Brian Finley's profile at www.hockeygoalies.org

1981 births
Living people
Barrie Colts players
Boston Bruins players
Brampton Battalion players
Canadian ice hockey goaltenders
Sportspeople from Sault Ste. Marie, Ontario
Milwaukee Admirals players
Nashville Predators draft picks
Nashville Predators players
National Hockey League first-round draft picks
Ice hockey people from Ontario